William II (or in Occitan: Guilhem II) was the second Lord of Montpellier.

Lords of Montpellier
Guilhem dynasty